The women's snowboard cross competition of the 2022 Winter Paralympics was held at Genting Snow Park on 6–7 March 2022.

Snowboard cross SB-LL2

The qualification was held on 6 March.

Quarterfinals to finals were held on 7 March.

Qualification

Quarterfinals

Heat 1

Heat 2

Heat 3

Heat 4

Semifinals

Heat 1

Heat 2

Finals
Small final

Big final

See also
Snowboarding at the 2022 Winter Olympics

References

Women's snowboard cross